The Dead Sea Museum (Arabic: متحف البحر الميت) is a history and natural history museum located in the Maeen subdistrict, Jordan. The museum is dedicated to showing the history of the Dead Sea and how civilizations developed around it.

History
Among the intentions for the creation was to promote tourism, and to facilitate the public to learn more about how the Dead Sea is constituted. The museum aims to raise awareness about the conservation of the Dead Sea. The construction of the museum was funded by the Japan International Cooperation Agency. The museum first opened in 2006, and is Jordan's first natural history museum. In 2015, for International Museum Day, educational activities for students from the South Jordan Valley were organized in this place.

Collections
The museum contains collections of rocks and minerals The museum exhibits are divided into four sections

 First section: The geology of the Dead Sea, as well as its formation.
 Second section: The study of the Dead Sea ecosystem.
 Third section: The human impact on the Dead Sea as well as the benefits that the existence of this sea has brought to the civilizations of the Middle East.
 Fourth section: The initiatives of protection and preservation of the Dead Sea as well as the identification of what are the ecological threats to the sea.

References

2006 establishments in Jordan
Museums established in 2006
Museums in Jordan
Museums of Ancient Near East in Jordan
Natural history museums
Madaba Governorate
Dead Sea